The Shadow Riders is a 1982 American Western television film directed by Andrew V. McLaglen and starring Tom Selleck, Sam Elliott, Dominique Dunne, and Katharine Ross. Based on the 1982 novel of the same name by Louis L'Amour, the film is about two brothers who meet up after fighting on opposite sides of the Civil War and return home only to find their siblings kidnapped by ruthless raiders. Together they set out on an adventure to rescue their family. The film reunites actors Selleck, Elliot, and Jeff Osterhage, who also starred in the 1979 film The Sacketts. The Shadow Riders first aired in the United States on Tuesday, September 28, 1982.

Plot
At the end of the Civil War, Confederate soldier Dal Traven (Sam Elliott) is about to be executed by a firing squad when he is rescued by a cavalry force led by Major Ashbury. Ashbury plans on continuing to fight the Union and invites Dal to join his group. Dal declines, deciding to go back to his home in Texas instead. On his way there he meets his brother Mac (Tom Selleck) who served as a Union officer. Despite serving on different sides the brothers bear no ill will toward each other.

Dal and Mac arrive home to find that their home has been looted and their two sisters, their brother Jesse (Jeff Osterhage), and Dal's girlfriend Kate (Katherine Ross) have been kidnapped. It is Ashbury who looted their home (along with many other homesteads). Ashbury has made camp by the Gulf of Mexico, where he is waiting to meet a smuggler by the name of Holiday Hammond. He plans to trade the goods, livestock, and prisoners he has stolen for guns to fight the Union. Jesse and Kate attempt an escape, but it does not go according to plan. Desperate, Jesse swims into the Gulf, but is shot and presumed dead.

Hammond arrives by boat and takes all of the prisoners, except Kate, to Mexico to be sold. Ashbury accompanies him. Dal and Mac track the Confederates and come across their wounded brother. The three of them attack the Confederate camp and rescue Kate. Kate informs the brothers that their sisters have been taken to Mexico. However, none of them have the local knowledge needed to navigate Mexico. Dal and Mac break their uncle Jack (Ben Johnson) out of jail to guide them.

Meanwhile in Mexico, Ashbury confronts Hammond. Hammond has continually deflected Ashbury's questions about the guns promised to him. Hammond reveals that he never had any intention of selling any guns and imprisons Ashbury. Jack successfully leads the group to Hammond's hide out and a battle commences. During the battle Ashbury escapes, but is caught by Dal. Dal prepares to shoot Ashbury for kidnapping his sisters, but spares him as Ashbury had earlier saved his life.

Hammond takes the Traven sisters and attempts to escape by train, but Dal and Mac pursue him on horseback, eventually catching the train. The brothers save their sisters and capture Hammond, but just as the Travens are reunited, the Texan sheriff who put Jack in jail arrives to arrest him again. However, the Travens convince the sheriff to trade Jack for Hammond (the most wanted man in Texas). With the rest of the prisoners freed, all five Traven siblings, Kate, and Jack begin the trip back to Texas.

Cast
 Tom Selleck as Mac Traven
 Sam Elliott as Dal Traven
 Dominique Dunne as Sissy Traven
 Katharine Ross as Kate Connery / Sister Katherine
 Ben Johnson as Uncle 'Black Jack' Traven
 Scanlon Gail as Yankee Officer
 Geoffrey Lewis as Major Cooper Ashbury, Comanchero Leader
 Jeff Osterhage as Jesse Traven
 Gene Evans as Colonel Holiday Hammond, Gunrunner
 R. G. Armstrong as Sheriff Miles Gillette
 Marshall R. Teague as Lieutenant Butler
 Ben Fuhrman as Devol
 Jane Greer as Ma Traven
 Harry Carey, Jr. as Pa Traven
 Natalie May as Heather Traven
 Jeannetta Arnette as Southern Belle
 Owen Orr as Frank King, Kate's Fiancee
 Kristina David as Renfro Damsel
 Joe Capone as Sergeant Ballock
 Robert B. Craig as Laird

Production

Filming locations
 Columbia State Historic Park, 22708 Broadway, Columbia, California 
 Railtown 1897 State Historic Park, Jamestown, California (Train scenes)
 Santa Cruz, California 
 Sonora, California
 Brookings, Oregon

References

External links

 
 
 

1982 television films
1980s English-language films
American Civil War films
American Western (genre) television films
CBS network films
Films based on works by Louis L'Amour
Films based on American novels
Films based on Western (genre) novels
Films directed by Andrew McLaglen
Films set in Texas
1980s American films